Eighty athletes representing 25 countries in three keelboat classes - the 2.4mR, the SKUD 18, and the Sonar, took part in sailing in the 2008 Summer Paralympics. Sailing was held in two designated areas on the Yellow Sea, Qingdao, Shandong province, from September 8 to September 13.

Competitors had a wide range of physical disabilities including degenerative nerve disease, blindness, missing limbs, and polio.

Boats were prepared and launched from the docks of the Qingdao International Sailing Centre, which also included the accessible Qingdao Paralympic Village, a 5-star hotel which previously housed the Olympic Sailing athletes.

Events
Three sailing events were held. All were mixed events, meaning that men and women could compete together.

International disability classification in sailing is done by a committee, which gives each competitor a number score with lower numbers corresponding to more severe disability. Sailors were classified under the IFDS Functional Classification System 2005 (FCS 2005). To take part in Paralympic sailing, an athlete must have a score of 7 or less. Functional Classification System full details: 

The 2-person keelboat (SKUD18) made its official début in the Paralympics. The only Paralympic class keelboat with a spinnaker, emblazoned with the national flag of each country. Of the 11 countries competing in the SKUD event, 7 had female crew.

Results
Eighty athletes represented twenty-five countries in the three event classes. Qualification full details

Medal table
This ranking sorts countries by the number of gold medals earned by their sailors (in this context a country is an entity represented by a National Paralympic Committee. The number of silver medals is taken into consideration next and then the number of bronze medals. If, after the above, countries are still tied, equal ranking is given and they are listed alphabetically.

Medallists
In the 2-person keelboat event, all three of the medal-winning teams were composed of one man and one woman. Those three women were the first women to win Paralympic medals in sailing. Sailing competition athletes and full results.

One Person Keelboat - 2.4 Metre

Two Person Keelboat - SKUD 18

Open Three-Person Keelboat - Sonar

References

External links
2008 Paralympic Sailing Competition, Qingdao
Official site of the 2008 Summer Paralympics
IFDS/ International Association for Disabled Sailing
ISAF/ International Sailing Federation

2008
2008 Summer Paralympics events
Paralympics
Sailing competitions in China